Youth With You 3 is a 2021 Chinese male group survival show by iQIYI. The third season features 119 trainees from different entertainment agencies, to form a 9-member male group through global viewers' votes. The group IXFORM officially debuted on 25 July 2021.

The show is the third season of the Youth With You series. This season was presented by Li Yuchun, with Lisa, Li Ronghao, and Will Pan serving as mentors. It aired from February 18, to May 1, 2021 on iQIYI every Thursday and Saturday at 7:00 pm CST, with subtitles available in several languages.

The grand finale, originally scheduled to be streamed live on May 8, 2021, was officially cancelled and the show was terminated after an order from the Chinese media government bureau, due to the show's milk-wasting controversies.

On 25 July 2021, two months after the termination, it was announced that group IXFORM debuted officially with top 9 members, Luo Yizhou, Jojo Tang Jiuzhou, Lian Huaiwei, Neil Liu Guanyou, Jerome Deng Xiaoci, Kachine Sun Yinghao, Liu Jun, X Duan Xingxing, Sun Yihang.

Concept 
In its third season Youth With You brings 119 trainees together who are either from entertainment agencies or are not signed under any company. 9 trainees will be selected through viewers' votes to form a boy group after weeks of evaluations, group performances, and eliminations.

Mentor 
 Li Yuchun — Youth PD
 Li Ronghao — Vocal mentor
 Lisa — Dance mentor
 Will Pan — Rap mentor
 Esther Yu – Youth tutor

X Mentors 

 G.E.M.
 Silence Wang

Contestants 
Color key
  Top 9 of the week
  Left the show
  Eliminated in Episode 10
  Eliminated in Episode 16
  Eliminated in Episode 20
  Eliminated in Episode 23
  Final members of IXFORM

Contestant Notes
 : Choreographer of 1MILLION Dance Studio
 : Member of Yi An Musical (易安音乐社)
 : Former contestant on Idol Producer
 : Former contestant on Produce X 101
 : Former contestant on Youth With You
 : Former contestant on Produce Camp 2019
 : Former contestant on All For One
 : Former contestant on We Are Young
 : Former contestant on The Next Top Bang
 : Former contestant on The Rap of China
 : Former contestant on The Coming One 2
 : Former contestant on Super Boy
 : Former trainee at SM Entertainment
 : Member of BGCode
 : Member of Jup1ter
 : Member of ALIBI
 : Former trainee of YG Entertainment
 : Member of Produce Pandas
 : Member of BC221
 : Member of Now United
 : Member of LIMITLESS
 : Member of D7BOYS
 : Member of TANGRAM
 : Member of JULY LAB
 : Member of All In
 : Member of Midsummer Cubs
 : Former member of CNK
 : Member of BEAUZ
 : Former trainee of FNC Entertainment
 : Former trainee of DSP Media
 : Former trainee of TOP Media

Top 9 
Color key

Elimination Chart 
Color key

Episodes

Premiere (17 February 2021) 
The mentors perform their stages. Their performances are repeated in episode 1.

Episode 1 (18 February 2021) 
This year the episode starts with a media conference. The trainees are asked to enter an interview either individually or as a group. This is similar to the grouping in the following evaluation performance, except for a group of trainees that have been singled out as the new N-class (stands for newbie class), where each trainee has had equal or less than 3 months of training. There are 30 media representatives present, who interview the trainees about their pasts, interests and ideas on what an idol should represent. Some trainees are shown to be very eloquent, while others quiver in fear. The trainees then move into the dorm.

The next day begins with the stage performances of the mentors. Lisa performs two dances, one to 《Lover》 by Cai Xukun and one to 《Intentions》 by Justin Bieber. Li Ronghao performs his own song 《selfie》, Will Pan also performs his own song 《Coming Home》 and Esther Yu debuts her song 《Gwalla》. Afterwards Li Yuchun enters and explains this years new rules: All performances will be live vocal performances. Each trainee will be graded according to their initial performance with A, B, C or N. A stands for excellent, C stands for pass. N will be the Newcomer class, where trainees will receive extra tutoring from the Youth tutor Esther Yu. Lisa is present via video call, while Esther Yu is not part of the grading. The performances are separated into different categories (e.g. originals, same song, rap battle etc.) and there are always two or more performances in direct comparison.

Episode 2 (20 February 2021) 

Evaluation stages continue.

Episode 3 (25 February 2021) 

Evaluation stages continue.

Episode 4 (27 February 2021) 

Position evaluation songs are announced. The first few performances of the Position Evaluations occur.

Missions

Mission 1: Position Evaluation 
Color key

 Winner
 Leader
 Center
 Leader & Center
 Newbie 'N' Class

Mission 2: Expression Stage 
Color key

 Winner
 Leader
 Center

Mission 3: Group Battle 
Color key

 Winner
 Leader
 Center

Mission 4: Theme Evaluation 
Color key

 Winner
 Leader
 Center

Mission 5: Collaboration Stages 
Color key

 Leader
 Center
 Leader & Center

Mission 6: Final Stage Performance 
Color key

 Center

Discography

Singles

Incidents

Censorship 
On 25 March 2021, the 11th episode of the season was originally scheduled to be aired on that day, but due to the Xinjiang cotton turmoil, and the clothing title of this show was Adidas, the airing of this episode was postponed. On 27 March 2021, when the episode was aired out of order, the brand logo was blurred out.

Fan behavior 
On 11 April 2021, Weibo administrators issued an announcement, citing irrational star-chasing behavior as an excuse to impose a 30-day ban on a series of fan club accounts, many of which are the fan clubs of Youth With You and Produce Camp (Chuang) trainees.

Departure of Tony Yu Jingtian 
On May 5, 2021, it was announced that the leading trainee, Tony Yu Jingtian had officially departed from the show, citing "health reason", right before the final night, possibly due to pressure from recent scandal involving his parent's alleged illegal businesses.

Before the finale, Tony was involved in a controversy on 30 April 2021, when rumors with multiple photo evidence surfaced on Weibo that his parents had relations to a KTV involved with drugs and prostitution. This caused an outrage among Chinese netizens, as China had a long history of battling with the social implications of drug use. Later that week, it was also questioned if Tony had dual citizenship, having both Chinese and Canadian citizenships, which is illegal in China for anyone over the age of 18 years old. Tony's mom took to social media that they were no longer involved in the operation after having sold it in 2008  but Chinese netizens had dug out court documents dating back to 2020 where his parents were listed as the defendants (owners) in a legal battle involving said KTV. Due to these controversies, many Chinese netizens repeatedly called for the withdrawal of Tony, even though netizens refute that he is innocent.

On 5 May 2021, iQiyi issued a statement that the show has suspended production and recording, following an order issued by the Beijing Municipal Radio and Television Bureau, and promises to make adjustments to the show. Shortly after, on the same day, Tony's agency, Astro Entertainment announced he would be leaving the show, citing "health reasons".

The scandal was investigated to be false accusations, his parents were eventually cleared from any wrongdoing claims.

Milk-wasting controversy
Aside from theamain votes of the domestic and international iQIYI app, Youth With You series also calculates votes from multiple platforms: Weibo, iQIYI Paopao, Mengniu Dairy milk app on WeChat, and others. Mengniu Dairy is the official sponsor of the series.

Fans could gain extra votes if they purchase its products and scan the QR codes printed inside the packaging to support their favorite contestant on WeChat. This has resulted in fan clubs buying milk products in huge amounts. This sponsor strategy is also used by another group survival show Produce Camp (Chuang).

During the second season, the QR codes were printed inside the bottle caps. In this season, the show still uses this strategy for its yogurt drinks, but also uses separate QR cards attached for bundle packs or flavored milk drinks to avoid the need to open the caps.

However, the show is involved in a major milk-wasting controversy when a video showing thousands of bottles of milk being bought up and then discarded by fans went viral on social media in May 2021. The video shows large amounts of milk was dumped into the drain after opening by some fans during Youth With You Season 2 because fans only needed the bottle caps for the QR codes. Nearly 270,000 bottles of the beverage were wasted in the video.

The act triggered massive criticism online. In light of China’s recent legislation to ban food waste, state media outlets and government agencies criticized the milk-wasting behavior.

On 7 May 2021, iQiyi closed all the voting channels, and announced on social media that the finale is cancelled and postponed, as it reviews and adjusts the rules of the show.

Finale cancellation
After the milk-wasting controversy broke, the production of the finale scheduled on 8 May 2021 was suspended since 5 May 2021. In the afternoon of 6 May 2021, the eliminated trainees returned to Dachang, the filming site of Youth With You, for the finale rehearsal, but left the site that night.

On 7 May 2021, iQiyi closed all the voting channels, and announced that the finale is cancelled and postponed. The future of the finale remains unclear at that point, whether it is postponed, cancelled completely, or the filming site will be changed.

News broke out that the finale has been recorded low-key or rehearsed in the midnight of 8 May. The debut team is reportedly formed and the team name is rumoured to be "NINEVER", while the 9-member line-up is consist of Luo Yizhou, Jojo Tang Jiuzhou, Lian Huaiwei, Neil Liu Guanyou, Jerome Deng Xiaoci, Kachine Sun Yinghao, Liu Jun, X Duan Xingxing, Sun Yihang. The ranking is speculated to be without manipulation as the show is under pressure.

Meanwhile, on 8 May 2021, many of the top 19 trainees who are not in the debut team has left respectively.

However, on 9 May 2021, iQIYI and the management of Youth With You announced on Weibo that the finale is officially cancelled and denied that they have formed a debut team.

Notes

References 

2021 Chinese television seasons